Spinetta Jade was an Argentine rock-jazz band active between 1980 and 1985, interspersed with Almendra's reunion and the solo career of Luis Alberto Spinetta.

History

Early months 

In his early months, the band was formed by Luis Alberto Spinetta (guitar and main vocals), Pedro Aznar (bass-guitar), Lito Vitale (keyboards), Juan del Barrio (keyboards) and Pomo Lorenzo (drums).

Alma de Diamante and recital with Serú Girán 

In August 1980, after the substitution of Lito Vitale for Diego Rapoport in the keyboards, and Pedro Aznar for Beto Satragni in the bass-guitar, the band  was presented the album Alma de Diamante. Then, in September, Jade was changed for Serú Girán in a recital.

Los niños que escriben en el cielo 

After some modifications in the lineup of the band (Beto Satragni was substituted by Frank Ojstersek in the bass guitar, and Juan del Barrio by Leo Sujatovich in the keyboards), Jade presented the album Los niños que escriben en el cielo in the Prima Rock Festival on September 1981.

Bajo Belgrano 

After the solo album of Spinetta, Kamikaze, and more modifications in the band’s lineup (Frank Ojstersek was replaced for César Franov in the bass-guitar), the album Bajo Belgrano was presented between another Spinetta's solo album: Mondo di Cromo. The third album of Jade had pop influences.

Madre en años luz and final 

In 1984, the band included Lito Epumer in the main guitar, and replaced Leo Sujatovich for Mono Fontana on keyboards. They went on to present their fourth and last album, Madre en años luz, with a concert at the Luna Park Stadium. This album has since influenced a lot of synth-pop sounds popular in Argentinian bands from the 1980s. Then, in the middle of 1985, with Paul Dourge in the Mini Moog, the band was dissolved.

Members

Discography

Studio albums

References

External links 
 Spinetta Jade in Rock.com.ar

Argentine rock music groups
Musical groups established in 1980
Musical groups disestablished in 1985
Argentine progressive rock groups